Line 9 of the Shenyang Metro is a rapid transit line running from northwest to southeast Shenyang in "L" shape. Line 9, together with Line 10 will form a loop around Shenyang.

Phase 1 of Line 9 is 28.996 km long with 23 stations. The line opened on 25 May 2019.

Opening timeline

Stations

Notes

References

09
Railway lines opened in 2019
2019 establishments in China